Devanand Konwar (1934 – 25 April 2020) was a senior congressman from Assam who served as the Governor of the Indian states of Tripura, Bihar and West Bengal.

Career
Konwar began his career as a lecturer in the English Department of Cotton College in Guwahati. Then in 1961 he went to work for the American firm Standard Vacuum Oil Company in Mumbai as a marketing manager and remained in that position for seven years, coordinating Petroleum Products distribution Networks in Northern and Eastern India from Trombay, Vizag, Barauni, Noonmati, Digboi Refineries and Budge-Budge sea Terminal and another company Inland Product Terminals. In 1968-69 he established a Degree College in Guwahati City known as Guwahati College as its founder Principal. In November 1969 he joined Gauhati High Court Bar and practised there as well as in the Supreme Court of India as an Advocate till 1991. He professionally served as Government Advocate for the States of Assam, Tripura, Arunachal Pradesh and Mizoram in the Gauhati High Court. He joined the Indian National Congress Party as a Student Leader in 1955 and had never been out of it till his death. He held various Party posts at District and State Levels at different times including General Secretaryship and Vice-Presidency of Assam Pradesh Congress Committee from 1983–1991. He had been chosen to lead a composite 28-member Friends of Soviet Union Delegation composed of participants from Assam, Andhra Pradesh, and Tamil Nadu to Moscow, Tashkent, Alma-Ata, Kiev, Sochi, Leningrad, etc. in 1988. He served as the Governor of Bihar. While he was the Governor of Bihar he was also given an additional charge as the Governor of West Bengal until he was succeeded by Mayankote Kelath Narayanan on 24 January 2011.

Political life
Komwar joined the Indian National Congress Party in 1955 as a Student Leader. He had been the Cabinet minister in the state government of Assam in 1991 Hiteswar Saikia Govt. and in 2001 Tarun Gogoi Govt.

References

 governor of Bihar 

Governors of Bihar
Governors of West Bengal
Indian National Congress politicians from Assam
2020 deaths
Cotton College, Guwahati alumni
1943 births
Governors of Tripura
State cabinet ministers of Assam
21st-century Indian politicians
Politicians from Guwahati